John Craven (June 22, 1916 – November 24, 1995) was an American actor in films and plays and on television.

Craven was born on June 22, 1916, in New York City. He was a third-generation actor, following in the profession of his father, Frank Craven, and his grandfather, John T. Craven. His mother, Mary Blythe, was an actress prior to marriage.

Craven originated the role of George Gibbs in the original stage version of Our Town, in which his father played the stage manager. Craven was overlooked in the movie version, however, with the part going to the then-unknown William Holden. Other Broadway shows in which Craven appeared included They Knew What They Wanted (1949), Spring Again (1941), Village Green (1941), Delicate Story (1940), Two On An Island (1940), Aries Is Rising (1939), and The Happiest Days (1939).

Craven was stationed in Naples during World War II and put on shows for the USO.

Though born in New York City, he attended Beverly Hills High School, in the early 1930s. His stage family had a long history of alternating generations of men named John with subsequent generations of men named Frank.

On November 24, 1995, Craven died at his home in Salt Point, New York.

Filmography
 Over the Goal (1937)
 The Human Comedy (1943)
 Dr. Gillespie's Criminal Case (1943)
 Someone to Remember (1943)

Selected Television

References

External links
 
 
 Obituary in The New York Times
 "Our Town" presented on The Campbell Playhouse, with Orson Welles and guest star John Craven (May 12, 1939)

1916 births
1995 deaths
20th-century American male actors
American male film actors
American male stage actors
Male actors from New York City